Matthew Stokes (born 7 October 1995) is a cricketer who plays for Guernsey. He played in the 2014 ICC World Cricket League Division Five tournament. In May 2015 he participated in the 2015 ICC Europe Division One tournament.

On 8 September 2015 in the 2015 ICC World Cricket League Division Six, Stokes scored an unbeaten 135 against Botswana.

He played in the 2016 ICC World Cricket League Division Five tournament, becoming the second highest run scorer in the competition with 247 runs from 6 matches.

In September 2018, he was the leading run-scorer for Guernsey in Group C of the 2018–19 ICC World Twenty20 Europe Qualifier tournament, with 132 runs in five matches.

In May 2019, he was named in Guernsey's squad for the 2019 T20 Inter-Insular Cup. He made his Twenty20 International (T20I) debut for Guernsey against Jersey on 31 May 2019. The same month, he was named in Guernsey's squad for the Regional Finals of the 2018–19 ICC T20 World Cup Europe Qualifier tournament in Guernsey.

In May 2021, during the Odey Wealth Championship in Guernsey, Stokes scored 213 not out from 168 balls in a 50-over match.

References

External links
 

1995 births
Living people
Guernsey cricketers
Guernsey Twenty20 International cricketers
Place of birth missing (living people)